Star Jalsha Movies is an Indian Bengali-Language movie pay television channel owned by The Walt Disney Company India. a wholly owned by The Walt Disney Company. it is the third most watched Bengali channel across all genres with TRP of 211 impressions during week 9 ratings in March 2021.

Launch
Jalsha Movies was launched on 16 December 2012 by STAR India. At the time of launch of this channel there were two more Bengali language movie channels Sony Aath and Zee Bangla Cinema.

References

External links

 
 

2012 establishments in West Bengal
Bengali-language television channels in India
Television channels and stations established in 2012
Movie channels in India
Television stations in Kolkata
Disney Star